Għajn Tuffieħa is a bay and sandy, red beach which is located in Mġarr, Malta. It is quieter than Golden Bay and often visited by Maltese natives themselves as well as tourist visitors. To reach this beach, one needs to descend a hill on a staircase of 200 steps. On top of the cliffs west of Għajn Tuffieħa bay, there is an old defense tower built in 1637. It is one of the seven towers built by Grand Master Giovanni Paolo Lascaris, of the Knights Hospitaller. 

The name also translates to "Apple's Eye", but it's presumed unlikely to be the case following the standard format of places starting with "Għajn" in Malta.

Għajn Tuffieħa has a cafe, Singita Miracle Beach, at the foot of the access staircase.

References

External links 
 Pictures of Għajn Tuffieħa Bay on Maltavista.net
 Tips for visiting Għajn Tuffieħa Bay on MaltaUncovered.com
Coordinates: 

Bays of Malta
Beaches of Malta
Mellieħa
Mġarr